Maublancia is a genus of beetles in the family Buprestidae, containing the following species:

 Maublancia auberti Thery, 1947
 Maublancia testui Thery, 1947

References

Buprestidae genera